Komsomolsky is a rural locality (a settlement) in Akhtubinsky Selsoviet, Krasnoyarsky District, Astrakhan Oblast, Russia. The population was 1,175 as of 2010. There are 8 streets.

Geography 
It is located on the Akhtuba River, 56 km northwest of Krasny Yar (the district's administrative centre) by road. Vishnevy is the nearest rural locality.

References 

Rural localities in Krasnoyarsky District, Astrakhan Oblast